Brandon Valentyn (born ) is a South African rugby union player for the  in the Currie Cup. His regular position is lock.

He also represented the Olimpia Lions in Súper Liga Americana de Rugby. He joined the  ahead of the newly formed Super Rugby Unlocked competition in October 2020.

References

South African rugby union players
Living people
1993 births
Rugby union locks
Pumas (Currie Cup) players
Yacare XV players
Boland Cavaliers players
Western Province (rugby union) players